Jérôme Eugène Coggia (18 February 1849 – 15 January 1919) was a 19th-century French astronomer and discoverer of asteroids and comets, who was born in the Corsican town of Ajaccio.

Working at the Marseille Observatory from 1866 to 1917, Coggia discovered a number of comets, including the bright "Coggia's Comet" (C/1874 H1). The periodic comet 27P/Crommelin was previously called "Comet Pons-Coggia-Winnecke-Forbes". He is also credited by the Minor Planet Center with the discovery of 5 asteroids at Marseille between 1868 and 1899.

Coggia was awarded by the French Academy of Sciences its Lalande Prize for 1873 and again for 1916.

Comets discovered or co-discovered 
 C/1870 Q1 (Coggia)
 27P/Crommelin
 C/1874 H1 (Coggia)
 C/1874 Q1 (Coggia)
 C/1877 R1 (Coggia)
 C/1890 O1 (Coggia)

References

External links 
 J. Coggia @ Astrophysics Data System
 Jerome Eugene Coggia, Astronomie-Homepage von Wolfgang Steinicke

1849 births
1919 deaths
20th-century French astronomers
19th-century French astronomers
Discoverers of asteroids
Discoverers of comets

People from Ajaccio
Recipients of the Lalande Prize